Baucau is the second-largest city in East Timor.

Baucau may also refer to:

 Baucau (Martian crater), an impact crater on Mars
 Baucau Administrative Post, a post in Baucau Municipality
 Baucau Airport, formerly Cakung Airport, an unattended airport near Baucau
 Baucau Municipality, a municipality, formerly a district, of East Timor
 Baucau Teachers College, a teacher education facility